The 2022–23 NHL Three Star Awards are the way the National Hockey League denotes its players of the week and players of the month of the 2022–23 season.

Weekly

Monthly

Rookie of the Month

Notes

References

Three Star Awards
Lists of NHL Three Star Awards